The Letter of Prince Piha-walwi of Hatti to King Ibiranu of Ugarit (CTH 110) is a Hittite diplomatic text of the 13th century BC.

Piha-walwi complains to King Ibiranu of Ugarit, that he had not sought an audience with the Hittite king, presumably  Tudhaliya IV, asking him to rectify this immediately and to send messengers with gifts for the king and for Piha-walwi himself.

Ibiranu seems to have complied, as in another letter, the Ugaritic ambassador to  Hattusa warns Ibiranu that the Hittite king was offended by the inferior gems he received, recommending that the king expects to be presented with lapis lazuli.

References
Gary M. Beckman, Harry A. Hoffner, Hittite diplomatic texts, volume 7 of Writings from the ancient world, Scholars Press, 1999,   (No. 21).

Hittite texts
Ugaritic language and literature